Christian Hermanus Cornelis van der Weerden (born 15 November 1972) is a Dutch football assistant manager and former player, currently working for SBV Vitesse as assistant manager to Phillip Cocu. Van der Weerden played professional football for NEC, Vitesse, PSV, FC Twente, Germinal Beerschot and FC Eindhoven.

References

External links

Profile at PSV Eindhoven

1972 births
Living people
Dutch footballers
Association football defenders
Eredivisie players
Eerste Divisie players
Belgian Pro League players
NEC Nijmegen players
SBV Vitesse players
PSV Eindhoven players
FC Twente players
Beerschot A.C. players
Dutch expatriate footballers
Dutch expatriate sportspeople in Belgium
Expatriate footballers in Belgium
FC Eindhoven players
Dutch football managers
Footballers from Nijmegen
Derby County F.C. non-playing staff